The DA postcode area, also known as the Dartford postcode area, is a group of eighteen postcode districts in England, within eleven post towns. These cover parts of south-east London and north-west Kent.

The main sorting office in Dartford ceased operating in 2012 and became a Delivery Office. The area served includes most of the London Borough of Bexley and very small parts of the London Borough of Bromley and the Royal Borough of Greenwich, while in Kent it covers almost all the Borough of Dartford, most of the Gravesham district, the northeastern part of the Sevenoaks district and a very small part of the borough of Tonbridge and Malling.



Coverage
The approximate coverage of the postcode districts:

|-
! DA1
| DARTFORD
| Dartford, Crayford, Barnes Cray
| Dartford, Bexley
|-
! DA2
| DARTFORD
| Dartford (east), Stone, Wilmington, Bean, Hawley, Darenth, part of Joyden's Wood
| Dartford, Sevenoaks
|-
! DA3
| LONGFIELD
| Longfield, Hartley, New Ash Green, New Barn, Fawkham
| Dartford, Sevenoaks, Gravesham
|-
! DA4
| DARTFORD
| Farningham, Eynsford, South Darenth, Sutton-at-Hone, Horton Kirby
| Sevenoaks, Dartford
|-
! DA5
| BEXLEY
| Bexley, Bexley Village, Blendon, parts of Albany Park and Joyden's Wood
| Bexley, Dartford
|-
! DA6
| BEXLEYHEATH
| Bexleyheath, Upton, Crook Log
| Bexley
|-
! DA7
| BEXLEYHEATH
| Bexleyheath (north), Barnehurst, Crook Log
| Bexley
|-
! DA8
| ERITH
| Erith, Northumberland Heath, Slade Green
| Bexley
|-
! DA9
| GREENHITHE
| Greenhithe, Stone
| Dartford
|-
! DA10
| SWANSCOMBE
| Swanscombe, Ebbsfleet
| Dartford
|-
! DA11
| GRAVESEND
| Gravesend (west), Northfleet
| Gravesham, Dartford
|-
! DA12
| GRAVESEND 
| Gravesend (east), Chalk, Shorne, Cobham
| Gravesham
|-
! DA13
| GRAVESEND
| Meopham, Istead Rise, Vigo, Southfleet
| Gravesham, Dartford, Sevenoaks, Tonbridge and Malling
|-
! DA14
| SIDCUP
| Sidcup, Foots Cray, North Cray, Longlands, Ruxley, part of Albany Park
| Bexley, Bromley
|-
! DA15
| SIDCUP
| Sidcup (north), Blackfen, Lamorbey, Longlands, Avery Hill (part)
| Bexley, Greenwich
|-
! DA16
| WELLING
| Welling, Falconwood, East Wickham, Crook Log
| Bexley, Greenwich
|-
! DA17
| BELVEDERE
| Belvedere, Lessness Heath, Abbey Wood (part)
| Bexley
|-
! DA18
| ERITH
| Erith Marshes, Thamesmead (part)
| Bexley
|}

Map

See also
List of postcode areas in the United Kingdom
Postcode Address File

References

External links
Royal Mail's Postcode Address File
A quick introduction to Royal Mail's Postcode Address File (PAF)

Postcode areas covering London
Postcode areas covering South East England
Borough of Dartford
Media and communications in the London Borough of Bexley